Madara Palameika (born 18 June 1987) is a Latvian track and field athlete who competes in the javelin throw. Her personal best of 66.18 m, set in 2016, is the Latvian record.

International competitions

References

External links 

1987 births
Living people
People from Talsi
Latvian female javelin throwers
Olympic athletes of Latvia
Olympic female javelin throwers
Athletes (track and field) at the 2012 Summer Olympics
Athletes (track and field) at the 2016 Summer Olympics
Athletes (track and field) at the 2020 Summer Olympics
World Athletics Championships athletes for Latvia
Athletes (track and field) at the 2019 European Games
European Games medalists in athletics
European Games bronze medalists for Latvia
Diamond League winners